Neochodaeus is a genus of sand-loving scarab beetles in the family Ochodaeidae. There are at least four described species in Neochodaeus.

Species
 Neochodaeus frontalis (LeConte, 1863)
 Neochodaeus praesidii (Bates, 1887)
 Neochodaeus repandus (Fall, 1909)
 Neochodaeus striatus (LeConte, 1854)

References

Further reading

 
 
 
 
 
 
 
 

Scarabaeoidea genera